RRI 2 stands for Radio Romania International.  It offers correct, impartial, quick, relevant, and understandable information and analysis about Romania and its citizens, about its geographical area, to listeners from other countries, with extremely different language, education, age and life experience.

Structure

 English language service
 French language service
 German language service
 Russian language service
 Spanish language service
 Hungarian language service
 Arabic language service
 Chinese language section
 Italian language section
 Serbian language section
 Ukrainian language section

References
 the RRI site

External links

 RRI.ro

Radio stations in Romania
Multilingual broadcasters
Romanian Radio Broadcasting Company